The Punjab region is an area of South Asia stretching from central and eastern Pakistan to northwest India.

Punjab or Panjab may also refer to:

Places
Punjab, India, a state and the eastern part of Punjab in India
Punjab, Pakistan, a province and the western part of Punjab in Pakistan
Panjab District, in Bamyan province of Afghanistan
Panjab, Afghanistan, the capital of Panjab District in Afghanistan
 Punjab Province (British India) (1849–1947), a former province of British India

Other uses
Panjab Ali Biswas, Bangladeshi politician
Punjab, a character in Little Orphan Annie

See also
 East Punjab, the part of the British Punjab Province which became part of India after partition
 East Punjab (state) (1947–1966)
 Patiala and East Punjab States Union (1948–1956), a former state of modern India
Punjab Assembly (disambiguation)
Punjab cricket team (disambiguation)
 Punjab Hill States Agency (1936–1947), an administrative unit of British India
 Punjab Rangers, border security officers 
 Punjab States Agency (1930–1947), an administrative unit of British India
Punjab University (disambiguation)
Punjabi (disambiguation)
Punjabi language
 Sikh Empire (also known as Sarkar Khalsa), a former religious monarchy in the region
 West Punjab, the part of the British Punjab Province which became part of Pakistan as a province after partition
 West Punjab Province (1947–1955)
 Bahawalpur (princely state), a princely state of British India